Mark Burkhalter (born December 12, 1960) is an American politician and real estate developer who served in the Georgia House of Representatives from 1993 to 2011.

Early life and education 
Mark Burkhalter was born in Atlanta, Georgia. He graduated from the University of Georgia in 1984 with bachelor's degree in Global Studies (Political Science) and a minor in German and Slavic languages.

Political career 
Burkhalter was elected to the Georgia House of Representatives from the 41st district between 1993 and 2003. He continued his service from the 36th district between 2003 and 2005. Burkhalter went on to represent the 50th district in the session between 2005 and 2011. During his terms in the Georgia General Assembly, he served as both Speaker and Speaker Pro Tempore of the Georgia House of Representatives. The various districts he represented were located in the Atlanta suburbs of north Fulton County in Georgia.

In 2008, Burkhalter served on the Platform Committee of the Republican National Convention and was a leader for Governor Mitt Romney's Presidential campaign in Georgia. Prior to his state congressional tenure, Burkhalter served as an intern on the legislative staff to U.S. Representative Newt Gingrich in Washington, D.C.

Racist ad controversy 
In 1994, while Burkhalter was campaign chairman for then-Fulton County, Georgia, Commission Chairman Mitch Skandalakis, he was involved in creating campaign fliers which depicted Gordon Joyner, an African-American politician running for a seat on the county commission, in a racist manner: Joyner's features were darkened, and he was photoshopped to have a large Afro, an enlarged lip, and a warped eye.

Burkhalter, who was deposed as part of a resulting libel lawsuit, was involved in delivering materials for the flyer, attributing it to a false political action committee, authorizing payment for part of its printing and approving its release, according to court documents. The libel lawsuit was settled for an undisclosed sum in October 1995, and Skandalakis, Burkhalter and other officials signed a letter of apology to Joyner in which they took "full responsibility" for the flyer. The signed apology says the flier “contained a distorted photograph of you and inaccurate statements regarding you and attributed to you.”

The flier sparked a controversy when it was released, with a 1995 editorial in the Atlanta Journal-Constitution calling it a “racist hit piece.” Court filings says that during a meeting Burkhalter attended before the flier was created, attendees discussed that “white voters in North Fulton County were unaware that Gordon Joyner is black.” The lawsuit said that "Defendants mailed the cards bearing the false pictures captioned 'Gordon Joyner' primarily to white voters residing in the northern part of Fulton County, for the purpose of instilling and inciting racial fears and prejudices on the part of those voters." During a deposition, Burkhalter said the doctoring of Joyner's photo was discussed and joked about because “the face looked a little funny.”

In addition to the lawsuit, Burkhalter was involved in an ethics investigation related to the flyer and following "nearly a year of proceedings, which included appearing in person before a hearing of the Ethics Commission, Mr. Burkhalter signed a consent order stating that he personally authorized payment for the flyer, failed to properly disclose the payment, and agreed that he violated Georgia law and would pay a civil penalty."

On July 14, 2020, the NAACP issued a statement opposing Burkhalter's nomination and calling for his withdrawal. Derrick Johnson, president & CEO of the NAACP, was quoted as saying that “Mr. Burkhalter’s actions were racist and deeply offensive. It is inconceivable that someone who sought to use racial prejudice to influence the electoral process could now be chosen to represent our democracy to the world."

Ambassadorial nomination 

President Donald Trump nominated Burkhalter to serve as the United States Ambassador to Norway on May 15, 2020. On January 3, 2021, his nomination was returned to the President under Rule XXXI, Paragraph 6 of the United States Senate.

Business career 
Parallel to his service in government, Burkhalter built a successful career in real estate development.

From 2010 Burkhalter led the UK Public Affairs effort for the international law and public policy firm McKenna Long & Aldridge. He continued to play an important role at the firm after McKenna Long & Aldridge initially merged with Dentons in 2015.

Dentons told CNN that Burkhalter resigned effective June 30, 2020, two days before the first media reports about his role in the racist ad controversy. Dentons told CNN that "We were unaware of the situation reported in the media, which predated Mark's affiliation with the firm."

Personal life 
Mark Burkhalter and his wife Gina, have three children; Natalie, Sam and Olivia.

The amphitheater in Newtown Park, Johns Creek, is named in honor of Mark Burkhalter for his efforts in gaining city-status for Johns Creek.

References

External links

|-

 
|-

 
|-

 

1960 births
Living people
Republican Party members of the Georgia House of Representatives